Cliff Odom is a former NFL football player. A third round draft choice in 1980, he played thirteen years in the NFL with the Cleveland Browns, Baltimore and Indianapolis Colts and Miami Dolphins. His son, Chris Odom, currently plays in the NFL for the Cleveland Browns, the team who drafted Cliff.

References

1958 births
People from Beaumont, Texas
Living people
American football linebackers
Texas–Arlington Mavericks football players
Cleveland Browns players
Baltimore Colts players
Indianapolis Colts players
Miami Dolphins players
Ed Block Courage Award recipients